Moustapha Bokoum (born 5 August 1999) is a Belgian professional footballer who plays as a forward.

Club career 
After ascending the youth ranks at Gent, Bokoum began attracting the attention of several English and Italian teams. In June 2018, he signed a professional contract with newly-promoted Ligue 2 side Béziers. The deal was for two years, with the option of a third. He made his professional debut on 3 August, replacing Rayane Aabid in the closing minutes of a 1–0 defeat to AC Ajaccio. He left the club by the end of the 2018–19 season.

Bokoum remained without club until 24 January 2020, where he returned to K.A.A. Gent. Bokoum played with Gent's reserve team until left the club at the end of his contract on 30 June 2020. He also suffered a serious knee injury in the same summer, which would keep him sidelined for about 6–8 months.

International career 
Bokoum is a youth international for Belgium, representing his country of birth several times at the under-17 level.

Born to a Guinean mother and a Congolese father, he is eligible to represent either nation at the senior level. He has retained a Guinean passport.

References

External links 
 
 
 
 
 ASB Foot Profile

Living people
1999 births
Belgian footballers
Belgium youth international footballers
Belgian sportspeople of Democratic Republic of the Congo descent
Belgian people of Guinean descent
Association football forwards
Club Brugge KV players
K.A.A. Gent players
AS Béziers (2007) players
Ligue 2 players